Sergio Gabriel Martínez (born 21 February 1975) is an Argentine professional boxer. He has held world championships in two weight classes, including the WBC super welterweight title from 2009 to 2010; and the unified WBC, WBO, Ring magazine and lineal middleweight titles between 2010 and 2014. With six successful defenses of the Ring and lineal middleweight titles, Martínez's 50-month reign as champion ranks as one of the longest in the history of that weight class.

In 2010 he was granted the Konex Award Merit Diploma as one of the five best boxers of the last decade in Argentina. In 2011, Martínez reached a career high ranking as the world's third best active boxer, pound for pound, behind Floyd Mayweather Jr. and Manny Pacquiao, as voted by most sporting news and boxing publications, including Sports Illustrated, ESPN, Yahoo! Sports, and The Ring. In 2010 he received Fighter of the Year awards by both The Ring and the Boxing Writers Association of America, as well as The Ring'''s Knockout of the Year for his rematch victory against Paul Williams. The WBC named him their Boxer of the Year in 2010 and 2012. A southpaw, Martínez was known as a fast and athletic fighter and his style has been described as "crowd-pleasing", partly because of his tendency to fight with his hands down when out of his opponents' range.

Outside the ring, Martínez has been an active spokesperson in the fight against bullying and domestic violence against women. He is the author of a book, Corazón de Rey ("Heart of a King"), and is said to be working on a second book.

Early life

Sergio Martínez was born on 21 February 1975 in Avellaneda to parents Hugo Alberto Martínez and Susana Griselda. Shortly afterwards the family relocated to the nearby city of Quilmes, which is also in the Buenos Aires Province. His father worked as a construction worker and metal worker, a trade which Sergio Martínez joined along with his two brothers, Sebastian and Hugo Jr. Martínez was bullied as a child in his "dirt-poor rural village." Before boxing, Martínez was a keen cyclist and football player and it was not until 1995 that he decided he would become a boxer. After being trained by his uncle, Ruben Paniagua, Martínez began boxing as an amateur and compiled a record of 39–2 (39 wins to 2 losses), the losses came by way of majority decision and knockout. His boxing career suffered a major setback in August 1996 when he broke his left hand, forcing him out of the sport for a year. Although he considered competing for Argentina at the 2000 Olympics, he decided that he was too old to wait the two and a half years and chose to turn professional in December 1997.

Professional career

Early years in Argentina
Martínez at the age of 22, had his first professional fight on 27 December 1997 in Ituzaingo, Buenos Aires, Argentina. The opponent for his professional debut, Cristian Marcelo Vivas, was disqualified in the second round, giving Martínez his first win. Martínez fought the first 17 fights of his career in his native Argentina, compiling a record of 16–0–1. The only blemish on his record at this point occurred in his third fight, a draw against Mario Javier Nieva over four rounds. Martínez rematched Nieva four months later and won a six-round unanimous decision.

After facing a relatively low level of opposition for his first 17 fights in Argentina, Martínez fought abroad for the first time, travelling to the United States to face Antonio Margarito on the undercard to the first Érik Morales vs Marco Antonio Barrera bout. The fight took place on 19 February 2000 at the Mandalay Bay in Las Vegas. The contest started badly for Martínez as Margarito scored a knockdown in the first round. Although Martínez recovered and had some success in the early rounds, he was hurt by a number of punches in round seven leading to a stoppage by the referee, thus handing Martínez his first loss. Following the Margarito fight, Martínez returned to Argentina and fought eight times, all victories, from April 2000 – February 2002. During this run of fights he won the Argentina welterweight title after outpointing Javier Alejandro Blanco. He successfully defended the title once, knocking out Sergio Ernesto Acuna in the seventh round, before being stripped of the title.

Relocation to Spain
After his final fight in Argentina, a February 2002 win over Francisco Mora, Martínez decided to relocate to Spain. It was there that he began his partnership with his current trainer Gabriel Sarmiento, who worked out of a gym in Azuqueca de Henares. During his time in Spain, Martínez also worked jobs such as; nightclub bouncer, dishwasher, construction worker and did modelling jobs for Adidas and Nike. From April 2002 – May 2003 he fought four times in Spain, all eight-round fights that he won against weak opposition, two of his opponents had lost their last six fights. This was to change in his next fight however, as he took on Richard Williams in England for the lightly regarded IBO light middleweight title. Martínez, who entered the ring as an underdog, having had only eight days preparation, won a unanimous decision. Although Williams scored knockdowns in the second and eleventh rounds, he was close to being stopped in the final round and the scorecards were heavily in Martínez's favour. He defended the IBO title twice in the United Kingdom; a twelfth round knock-out victory of Adrian Stone in Bristol was followed by a rematch against Williams in Belfast, on this occasion Williams was stopped in the ninth round. Over the next two and a half years, Martínez won seven fights in a row back in Spain, six of which were against boxers who had losing records. Soon thereafter, Martínez began to gain recognition and pursue fights in the United States, under the guidance of adviser Sampson Lewkowicz.

Light middleweight

Martínez vs. Cintron
Martínez claimed the Interim WBC light middleweight championship on 4 October 2008, beating Alex Bunema via an eighth round retirement. On 14 February 2009 Martínez fought to a majority draw against Puerto Rican Kermit Cintron. The fight was controversial for a number of reasons; during the seventh round Martínez knocked Cintron down with a clean left hand shot and the referee reached the count of ten and waved the fight off. However, this was disputed by Cintron, who claimed that the knockdown was a result of a headbutt but actually the headbutt which Cintron claimed to have happened was actually an extremely powerful and accurate cross from Sergio Martínez. Cintron's protestations led to the referee overturning his decision and the fight continued. The fight went the twelve round distance and the scorecards revealed a draw, many ringside observers felt that the decision was a robbery and that Martínez easily outboxed Cintron and should have gained the victory.

On 21 May 2009, WBC light middleweight champion Vernon Forrest was stripped of his title due to a rib injury that would leave him out of action indefinitely. Because of the injury and his inability to fight Sergio Martínez, Martínez's interim title was upgraded to full WBC title status. Although the organization also mandated that Martínez face Forrest, that bout would never happen. Less than a month later, Forrest was tragically murdered in Atlanta, GA.

Middleweight

Martínez vs. Williams I
On 5 December 2009 Martínez fought Paul Williams in a non-title middleweight bout at Atlantic City's Boardwalk Hall in a fight that was later described as a fight of the year candidate. In the first round Williams and Martínez would both knock each other down once. Martínez would then seem to control the next two rounds with effective power punching. Then Williams seemed to narrowly take control of the fight when he seemingly won rounds 4, 5, 6 and 7 by landing hard left hands to the side of Martínez's head. Rounds 8–10 then signified that the fight would be close on the score-cards when Martínez won those rounds by repeating what he did in rounds 2 and 3. Then in the final 2 rounds (11–12), both fighters began to fade although the exchanges remained very closely contested, although Williams was far more active and therefore would seemingly win those final 2 rounds based on the fact that he was far more active in the last 2 rounds of the fight. That would turn out to be the case as Williams would escape with a majority decision victory with scores of 114–114, 119–110 (for Williams) and 115–113 (for Williams).

Martínez vs. Pavlik
After an impressive performance against Paul Williams, Sergio Martínez stayed at middleweight and challenged WBC, WBO, The Ring and lineal middleweight champion Kelly Pavlik. The fight took place in Atlantic City's Boardwalk Hall on 17 April 2010. Martínez defeated Pavlik via unanimous decision in a bout which saw Martínez overcome a knockdown in the seventh round and go on to dominate a majority of the remaining rounds in the fight. Pavlik had cuts above both eyes for several rounds, which did not stop bleeding. He said they affected his vision and performance. Although there was a rematch clause in the contract, Pavlik chose not to enforce it, stating his desire to move up in weight. The victory over Pavlik earned Martínez the WBC, WBO, Ring and lineal middleweight championships.

With Martínez winning the middleweight championship, he was required to make some decisions regarding his conflicting WBC light middleweight title. The sanctioning organizations for boxing recognize that boxers may choose to move up or down in the weight categories, yet they also wish to make all championship belts available to challenge. As such, their rules prohibit a fighter from simultaneously holding belts in multiple divisions. This prohibition includes holding a title with one sanctioning organization while also holding a title in a different weight class with a different organization. Eight weeks after the Pavlik fight, when Martínez failed to announce a preference to be a light middleweight or a middleweight champion (the WBO rules allow ten days to decide), the WBO stripped him of their middleweight title. A week later, Martínez did inform the WBC that he was willing to vacate their Light Middleweight title and maintain his WBC Middleweight belt.

Martínez vs. Williams II

On 20 November 2010, Sergio got a chance to avenge his loss to Williams. Both fighters were ranked among the top six pound-for-pound fighters, and Williams came into the fight as the Ring No. 2 ranked Middleweight. Many speculated that this would be a fight of the year candidate. Approximately one minute into the second round, Martínez knocked Williams out with an over-the-top left hand to retain his title. The knockout was called by many as the knockout of the year.
Williams stated to Max Kellerman after the fight, "He caught me with a punch I did not see."

Martínez vs. Dzinziruk

Sergio Martínez's next fight was against undefeated Sergiy Dzindziruk on 12 March 2011 at the Foxwoods Resort Casino, Mashantucket, winning by TKO in 8 rounds. Dzindziruk, the WBO light middlweight champion, was knocked down five times in the fight.
Martinez was also awarded the WBC Diamond belt.

Martínez vs. Barker

Martínez then fought undefeated EBU middleweight champion Darren Barker on 1 October at the Boardwalk Hall in Atlantic City. He knocked Barker out with an extremely powerful right hook and put Barker to his knees in the 11th round.

Many boxing analysts and experts said that Darren Barker has the skills and ring generalship to one day become a champion, but that his skills were not perfected enough to do anything against Martínez. The first few rounds showed that Barker was actually able to make Martínez uncomfortable in the ring and give him more trouble than expected. Throughout the fight, Barker consistently gave Martínez problems, while never hurting him or really ever winning any of the rounds, he gave Martínez a challenge by coming in but not giving much offence to let Martínez counter or land anything clean. He also managed to get Martínez's nose to bleed early in the rounds by an upper-cut. Martínez, however, fought through the difficulty and eventually found openings which led to a knock-out of Barker, in the 11th with a right hook.

Martínez vs. Macklin

Sergio successfully defended his The Ring title against the No. 3 Ring Middleweight Matthew Macklin of Ireland on 17 March 2012 at the Madison Square Garden in New York City. Macklin was coming off a very impressive performance against middleweight champion Felix Sturm prior his fight with Martínez, a fight that many felt Macklin won, but he lost a controversial decision to Sturm in Germany. Macklin unexpectedly threw vigorous hooks and jabs that left Martínez behind on the scorecards and left Martínez in a sense of urgency. The Madison Square Garden crowd was largely pro-Macklin. The fight was featured on BBC's boxing schedule for 2011:
"18: Madison Square Garden, New York City, Sergio Martinez beat Matthew Macklin by 11th-round KO (The Ring middleweight). ".

Martínez struggled in the first half of the fight, with Macklin able to time Martínez very well, which neutralized much of Sergio's offensive attack (and would even score a knock-down on Martínez in the seventh round). Martínez was able to turn the tide in the later rounds, finding his range with his left hand. After scoring two knockdowns in the 11th, Macklin's corner stopped the fight shortly before the 12th round.

Martínez vs. Chávez Jr.

This fight was notable in that the WBC did not initially want Chávez Jr. to fight Martinez. Chávez Jr.'s godfather was the head of WBC and refused to allow the fight, even after a unanimous vote to allow the unbeaten champion to fight the current title holder. 

Martinez prepped for this fight against Chavez Jr. in Oxnard, California training under his career long coach, Gabriel Sarmiento. Martínez fought Julio César Chávez Jr. on 15 September 2012, at the Thomas & Mack Center in Paradise, Nevada for Chávez Jr.'s WBC Middleweight title. Martínez won by unanimous decision after surviving a 12th round knock down following a dominant performance over the first 11 rounds. ESPN, and The Los Angeles Times all gave round-by-round reports on the fight.

Martínez out worked and out landed Chávez throughout the first 11 rounds of the fight, in dominating fashion. Though Chávez had his moments trapping Martínez in the corner on the ropes, Martínez fought Chávez and used his fast lateral movement to avoid and neutralize Chávez' offensive attack. Chávez hurt Martinez in the 12th round, sending him to the canvas halfway through the round. Martínez got up with a little over one minute left in the fight, and rather than clinch or hold on to Chávez, Martínez continued to throw and trade blows with the Mexican. Despite being fatigued and clearly hurt, Sergio Martínez managed to survive the thrilling 12th round without holding. Martínez won the fight by unanimous decision, by the scores of 117–110, 118–109, and 118–109. After the fight, it was revealed that Martínez had broken his left hand (as early as the 4th round) and torn his right meniscus, the latter of which would require surgery.Rafael, Dan (17 October 2012). Sergio Martinez to Have Knee Surgery , ESPN.com. Retrieved 17 November 2012.

After the fight, Chávez tested positive for cannabis. As a result, he received a fine of $20,000 and was indefinitely suspended by the World Boxing Council.

Martínez vs. Murray
After his surgery, Martínez confirmed his next title defense would take place in his native Argentina, in what would be his first fight in his home country since leaving for Spain in 2002. News agency Reuters reported that Martínez could make his first title defense against British fighter Martin Murray on 27 April 2013 in Argentina. Martínez defeated Ring Top 10 Middleweight Martin Murray by a controversial unanimous decision. Many observers stated that there had been a clear deterioration in Martínez since the Chávez Jr. bout.

Martínez vs. Cotto
After a series of setbacks including further surgeries on his knees, Martínez fought again over a year after the Murray fight, losing his WBC, The Ring'' and lineal middleweight titles to three-division former world champion Miguel Cotto on 7 June 2014, at Madison Square Garden in New York City. It was evident straight away that Martinez's legs were not there, even with knee braces on and clearly visible, Cotto knocked Martínez down three times in the first round. After the first round however, he began to make the fight competitive with Cotto. He continued to fight back until round nine when Martínez went down once again. Following the ninth round, trainer Pablo Sarmiento decided to call off the fight prior to the tenth round while still in the corner, against the urging of Martínez. According to reports, Sarmiento told Martínez "Champion, your knees are not responding. Sergio, look at me ... I'm gonna stop this one. Sergio, you are the best for me. You'll always be the best champion, Sergio."

Following the bout, Martínez stated that he wanted to continue his boxing career, and expressed his desire to fight against Manny Pacquiao and Floyd Mayweather Jr. However, on 13 June 2015, Martínez announced his retirement from boxing at the age of 40, stating that both aging and knee injuries were the causes for his decision. Since 2020, Martinez has had a succession of comeback fights and is currently ranked in the top 10 at age 47.

Personal life
Martinez still resides in Madrid, Spain. He is divorced and once dated sports commentator Silvana Carsetti.

Activism
Martinez has been presented with an award for helping bullied children. He has also championed the cause of domestic violence against women. He attended a news conference to support legislation involving the Violence Against Women Act. Martinez was quoted as saying: "With domestic violence, no one wanted to touch the subject with a 10-foot pole. I was interested in the issue that a boxer, who dishes out violence, could also be thoughtful and do something and people would listen to someone like me. I thought I could have the most impact by speaking out on the issue."

Professional boxing record

Pay-per-view bouts

See also
List of world light-middleweight boxing champions
List of world middleweight boxing champions

References

External links

1975 births
Living people
Sportspeople from Avellaneda
Bailando por un Sueño (Argentine TV series) participants
People from Quilmes
Sportspeople from Oxnard, California
Argentine male boxers
Southpaw boxers
Argentine people of Spanish descent
Argentine expatriate sportspeople in Spain
World Boxing Council champions
World Boxing Organization champions
World middleweight boxing champions
The Ring (magazine) champions
Welterweight boxers
World light-middleweight boxing champions
International Boxing Organization champions